Dilnaz Irani is an Indian film, theatre and television actress. She started her Bollywood career as an actress in films such as 68 Pages and Jodhaa Akbar, and has appeared in the films Heroine in 2012 and Aligarh.

Personal life
Dilnaz was born in Mumbai, Maharashtra to an Irani family. She completed her Electronics Engineering studies from St. Xaviers, Mumbai and has completed eight levels of the Trinity College London exam course and has also worked as a software engineer for four years.

Acting and modelling
Dilnaz has acted in theatre plays and has been a ramp model, participated in a mega model contest, appeared in a music video and been a VJ for a music related show. Later, she has become a film, television and web actress with a main role as Kavita in the series Ragini MMS: Returns.

Filmography

Television

References

External links
 

Living people
Actresses from Mumbai
Indian film actresses
Indian television actresses
Indian soap opera actresses
Indian stage actresses
Actresses in Hindi television
21st-century Indian actresses
Year of birth missing (living people)